Kaarst IKEA station is a Rhine-Ruhr S-Bahn station in the town of Kaarst in the German state of North Rhine-Westphalia. It was opened as Holzbüttgen between 1954 and 1957 on the remaining part of the Neuss–Viersen railway, which was opened by the Rhenish Railway Company on 15 November 1877. It was reopened as IKEA Kaarst (after the nearby IKEA store) on 26 September 1999 and given its current name on 16 June 2002.

The station is served by Rhine-Ruhr S-Bahn line S 28 at 20-minute intervals

The station is served by one taxibus service, 861 (Holzbüttgen/Sandfeld – Neusser Str), operated by Busverkehr Rheinland at 60-minute intervals.

References 

S28 (Rhine-Ruhr S-Bahn)
Rhine-Ruhr S-Bahn stations
Railway stations in Germany opened in 1954